Captain Francis William Crake MC (19 April 1893 – 28 November 1920) was a British Army and Royal Irish Constabulary officer.

Early life
Francis Crake was born on 19 April 1893 in Newcastle upon Tyne, where he also resided. Crake was originally employed as an Insurance Agent's Clerk before joining the Royal Army Medical Corps in 1909, serving with the 1st Northumbrian Field Ambulance until 1913.

First World War
Following the outbreak of the First World War, Crake enlisted into the 11th Reserve Regiment of Cavalry in September 1914.  After leaving the cavalry in June 1915, Crake then entered service with the Hampshire Regiment (later the Royal Hampshire Regiment) and served on the Western Front from July 1915 to June 1917. Subsequently, he was selected for officer training and was commissioned into the Bedfordshire Regiment (later the Bedfordshire and Hertfordshire Regiment) on 27 November 1917. In April 1918, he returned to the front, joining the 6th Battalion of the Bedfordshires, however the following month this unit was broken up and absorbed by 1/1st battalion, the Hertfordshire Regiment. He finished the conflict with the rank of captain.

Military Cross
He was awarded the Military Cross for his conduct in September 1918 during the Allied Hundred Days Offensive. His citation reads:

Irish War of Independence
In August 1920, he was appointed District Inspector in command of a unit of the Royal Irish Constabulary Auxiliary Division, based at Macroom in County Cork. On 28 November, while leading a motorised patrol, he was killed in the Kilmichael Ambush.

See also 
 William Thomas Barnes – another Auxiliary killed in the Kilmichael Ambush

References

1893 births
1920 deaths
Military personnel from Newcastle upon Tyne
Burials in Northumberland
Royal Hampshire Regiment soldiers
Bedfordshire and Hertfordshire Regiment officers
Hertfordshire Regiment officers
Recipients of the Military Cross
Royal Irish Constabulary officers
British military personnel killed in the Irish War of Independence
Royal Army Medical Corps soldiers
British Army personnel of World War I